In chemistry, materials science, and physics, the solidus is the locus of temperatures (a curve on a phase diagram) below which a given substance is completely solid (crystallized). 
The solidus temperature, TS or Tsol, specifies the temperature below which a material is completely solid, and the minimum temperature at which a melt can co-exist with crystals in thermodynamic equilibrium. The solidus is applied, among other materials, to metal alloys, ceramics, and natural rocks and minerals.

The solidus quantifies the temperature at which melting of a substance begins, but the substance is not necessarily melted completely, i.e., the solidus is not necessarily a melting point. For this distinction, the solidus may be contrasted to the liquidus. The solidus is always less than or equal to the liquidus, but they need not coincide. If a gap exists between the solidus and liquidus it is called the freezing range, and within that gap, the substance consists of a mixture of solid and liquid phases (like a slurry). Such is the case, for example, with the olivine (forsterite-fayalite) system.

In eutectic mixtures the solidus and liquidus temperatures coincide at a point known as the eutectic point. At the eutectic point, the solid congruently melts (i.e., melts completely).

See also
 Melting/ freezing point
 Liquidus

References

Materials science
Phase transitions
Physical chemistry
Threshold temperatures